The expert wizard amendment was a proposed amendment by New Mexico state senator Duncan Scott, which would require psychologists and psychiatrists to dress up as wizards when they were in court proceedings providing expert testimony regarding a defendant's competency. The amendment, proposed in 1995, passed New Mexico's Senate unanimously. Scott revealed the amendment was satirical prior to a vote in New Mexico House of Representatives following which it was removed and thus never signed into law.

Scott said that he crafted the amendment because he felt that there were an excessive number of mental health practitioners acting as expert witnesses.

Text of the amendment 
The full text of the amendment was,

References 

New Mexico law